
Gmina Puńsk is a rural gmina (administrative district) in Sejny County, Podlaskie Voivodeship, in north-eastern Poland, on the Lithuanian border. The current mayor of Gmina Puńsk is Witold Liszkowski (Vytautas Liškauskas).

It is a bilingual district, with about 73.4% of the population belonging to the Lithuanian minority in Poland (the 2011 Census).

Villages
Gmina Puńsk contains the villages and settlements of Boksze-Osada, Buda Zawidugierska, Buraki, Dowiaciszki, Dziedziule, Giłujsze, Kalinowo, Kompocie, Krejwiany, Nowiniki, Ogórki, Oszkinie, Pełele, Poluńce, Przystawańce, Puńsk, Rejsztokiemie, Sankury, Sejwy, Skarkiszki, Smolany, Stare Boksze, Szlinokiemie, Szołtany, Tauroszyszki, Trakiszki, Trompole, Widugiery, Wiłkopedzie, Wojciuliszki, Wojtokiemie, Wołyńce and Żwikiele.

Neighbouring gminas
Gmina Puńsk is bordered by the gminas of Krasnopol, Sejny and Szypliszki. It also borders Lithuania.

References

Punsk
Sejny County
Bilingual communes in Poland